2014 Thai League Division 1 (known as Yamaha League 1 for sponsorship reasons) is the 17th season of the League since its establishment in 1997. It is the feeder league for the Thai Premier League. A total of 18 teams will compete in the league this season.

Changes from last season

Team changes

From Division 1
Promoted to Thai Premier League
 Air Force AVIA
 Singhtarua 
 PTT Rayong

Relegated to Regional League Division 2
 Rayong
 Rayong United

To Division 1
Relegated from Thai Premier League
 Pattaya United

Promoted from Regional League Division 2
 Roi Et United
 Chiangmai
 Phitsanulok
 Ang Thong

Teams

Stadia and locations

Personnel and sponsoring
Note: Flags indicate national team as has been defined under FIFA eligibility rules. Players may hold more than one non-FIFA nationality.

Foreign players
The number of foreign players is restricted to seven per DIV1 team, including a slot for a player from AFC countries. A team can use four foreign players on the field in each game, including at least one player from the AFC country.

League table

Results

Season statistics

Top scorers
.

Hat-tricks

Awards

Monthly awards

Annual awards

Player of the Year
Goalkeeper of the Year –  Kampol Pathom-attakul
Defender of the Year –  Pralong Sawandee
Midfielder of the Year –  Panuwat Yimsa-ngar
Striker of the Year –  Ivan Bošković

Coach of the Year
The Coach of the Year was awarded to  Totchtawan Sripan.

Golden Boot
The Golden Boot was awarded to  Marc Landry Babo.

See also
 2014 Thai Premier League
 2014 Regional League Division 2
 2014 Thai FA Cup
 2014 Thai League Cup
 2014 Kor Royal Cup
 Thai Premier League All-Star Football

References

2014
2